Diana Ifeoma Ude (born 1986 in Enugu, Nigeria) is a Polish singer. She is the daughter of a Polish mother and a Nigerian father of the Igbo tribe. She came to Poland at the age of three, where she lived with her maternal grandmother in Opole. She studied culture at Warsaw University.

She was one of the ten participants in the Polish national final for the Eurovision Song Contest 2018, performing the song "Love is Stronger". With 16 points, she came in the 4th place.

Discography 
 Albums
2013: Ifi Ude

 Singles
2013: ArkTika
2012: My Baby Gone
2017: Love is Stronger

References

Polish singers
Living people
1986 births
People from Opole
Musicians from Enugu
Polish people of Nigerian descent
21st-century Polish singers